The Crusade of Tedelis was a major conflict within the overarching struggle between the Crown of Aragon and the Kingdom of Tlemcen in the late 14th century.

Background 

The Crusade 
The fleet gathered in Ibiza, amassing a total force of 70 ships and 7,500 crusaders. The fleet set sail in August 1398,and successfully reached Dellys, which was sacked, killing around 1,000 villagers. After attacking the North African Coast, the expedition then headed towards Avignon to try to relive Pope Benedict XIII from the siege the city was under, led by Geoffrey Boucicaut who was opposed to the Avignon Pope. However, the fleet could not cross the Rhône due to the low water level of the river and directly grant aid, though they did manage to grant a three-month truce for the besieged.

Aftermath 
King Martin managed to negotiate the release of the captured Aragonese in exchange for releasing 300 Tlmeceni prisoners captured during the raid on Tedelis. The following year, Martin ordered a repeat of the campaign, this time, directed at Bona.

References

Crusades
Western Schism
14th century in Aragon
Zayyanid dynasty